Louise Essengue Eloumu Parfait  (born 6 July 1990) is a Cameroonian footballer who plays for Italian club Colleferro. He was known as Essengue or P.Essengue on his shirt but commonly refer as Louise Parfait in Italian media.

Career

Club career
Essengue began his career in Italy with Genoa. With the youth team he won the Coppa Italia Primavera 2008/09.

He was sent on loan to Serie B club Piacenza for the 2009–10 season.
He made his debut for Piacenza on October 24, 2009 as starter in a 2–3 home defeat against Modena.

On 21 July 2011 he was signed by Ascoli.

On 21 June 2012 he was transferred to A.C. Cesena for €150,000 in 4-year contract.

On 2 September 2013 Essengue joined Italian third division club Lecce. On 14 January 2014 he was signed by Pisa.

On 8 August 2014 Essengue was sold to Chiasso.

International career
Parfait has played for Cameroon at Under-20 level. In 2009, he played in the African Youth Championship which was held in Rwanda.

He also represented Cameroon team in the 2009 FIFA U-20 World Cup, where he played three games.

References

External links
Profile at AIC.it

1990 births
Footballers from Yaoundé
Cameroonian footballers
Cameroon under-20 international footballers
Cameroonian expatriate footballers
Association football midfielders
Expatriate footballers in Italy
Expatriate footballers in Switzerland
Serie B players
Serie C players
Swiss Challenge League players
Genoa C.F.C. players
Piacenza Calcio 1919 players
F.C. Crotone players
Ascoli Calcio 1898 F.C. players
A.C. Cesena players
U.S. Lecce players
Pisa S.C. players
FC Chiasso players
Macedonian First Football League players
Living people